Riblak-e Sofla (also Romanized as Rīblak-e Soflá; also known as Rāh Balag-e Soflá and Rībalag-e Soflá) is a village in Harasam Rural District, Homeyl District, Eslamabad-e Gharb County, Kermanshah Province, Iran. At the 2006 census, its population was 193, in 41 families.

References 

Populated places in Eslamabad-e Gharb County